Ye County or Yexian is a county under the administration of the prefecture-level city of Pingdingshan, Henan province, China, with a population of .

The ancient town of Kunyang was located in Ye County. It was the site of the critical Battle of Kunyang, in which the Han forces decisively defeated the army of Wang Mang's Xin Dynasty. The ancient city of Ye was the origin of the common Chinese surname Ye  (叶/葉).

Administrative divisions
As 2012, this county is divided to 5 towns, 12 townships and 1 ethic townships.
Towns

Townships

Ethnic townships
Mazhuang Hui Township

Climate

Religious Persecution
Kunyang is home to China's No. 1 Prison of Women of Yunan where the Chinese Christians, Ju Dianghong and Liang Qin are serving sentences of 13 years and 10 years respectively for their Christian activities.

References

County-level divisions of Henan
Pingdingshan